Origin is the first demo album by American rock band Evanescence. A collection of home-recorded demos, the CD was self-released in 2000, with 2,500 copies made. It was sold on the Bigwig Enterprises website in limited quantities.

Background
Origin was produced by a friend of the band members. It was self-released in 2000, with 2,500 copies being made. Although initially considered their debut album, co-founder Amy Lee confirmed it was a "dressed up" demo CD, and it is now regarded as an extended collection of demos. Lee stated in 2003,  She later added: 

In 2003, both Lee and co-founder Ben Moody encouraged fans to download it rather than purchase it for such high prices online. 

Origin contains earlier versions of "Whisper", "Imaginary", and "My Immortal", which appeared on Fallen, as well as a re-recorded version of the track "Where Will You Go", which previously appeared on the Evanescence EP released in 1998. One known track omitted was "Catherine", which Lee and Moody wrote on an acoustic guitar in the parking lot of a movie theater. 

"Whisper" was released as the lead single from Origin.

Release
Origin was released commercially for the first time in February 2017 as a part of The Ultimate Collection vinyl box set. In an interview, Lee explained why she included it on the box set:It's something I've always cringed about because ever since we made a real studio album and honed in our sound and became Evanescence and made Fallen, I'm like, 'OK, everything before this we were just practicing.' But many fans love Origin and talk about Origin and wish Origin would be released. I've been against it for 13 years, but for the first time I guess I have enough separation from it to look at it and feel like, 'Y'know what? I see why that's cool. As a fan, I want to listen to that too.' So having that whole change of heart was really huge.

The track "Even in Death" was re-recorded for the box set, and included on the 2016 compilation album Lost Whispers. Lee stated: "It really felt like redemption, like that song was truly redeemed because the early recording we have is not an enjoyable recording, but I really love that song."

Critical reception
Sam Law of Kerrang! said that "there's limited reason for anyone other than die-hards to seek it out", deeming "Lies" the stand out track for Lee's "towering classical soprano delivery – the peak nu-metal synth/guitar interplay and additional death growls courtesy of Living Sacrifice vocalist Bruce Fitzhugh".

Track listing

Personnel
Credits adapted from the liner notes of Origin.

Evanescence

Amy Lee – vocals, piano, keyboards, arrangements
Ben Moody – guitar, programming
David Hodges – keyboards, backing vocals

Production
Ben Moody – engineering
Brad Blackwood – mastering
 Soundforge – recording technology
 Mastered at Ardent Studios in Memphis, Tennessee 

Additional musicians
 Will Boyd – bass on "Away From Me"
 Bruce Fitzhugh and Stephanie Pierce – vocals on "Lies"
 Suvi Petrajajrvi, Sara Moore, Catherine Harris, and Samantha Strong – female vocal ensemble on "Field of Innocence"

Additional personnel
 Adrian James – package design
 Amy Bennett – site photography 
 Rocky Grey – cover photo
 Ben Moody, Sr. – band photography

References

Evanescence albums
2000 albums
Demo albums
Self-released albums